Kyrgyzstan participated at the 2018 Summer Youth Olympics in Buenos Aires, Argentina from 6 October to 18 October 2018.

Medalists

Athletics

Girls
Track & road events

Basketball

Kyrgyzstan qualified a boys' team based on the U18 3x3 National Federation Ranking.

 Boys' tournament – 1 team of 4 athletes

Dunk contest

Fencing

Kyrgyzstan qualified one athlete based on its performance at the 2018 Cadet World Championship.

Boy's

Mixed team

Judo

Boy's

Girl's

Swimming

Weightlifting

Kyrgyzstan qualified one athlete based on its performance at the 2018 Asian Youth Championships. But they didn't participated that.

 Boys' events – 1 quota (not used)

Wrestling

Boy's Greco-Roman

References

2018 in Kyrgyzstani sport
Nations at the 2018 Summer Youth Olympics
Kyrgyzstan at the Youth Olympics